Kristen Harris is Professor of Neuroscience and Fellow in the Center for Learning and Memory at the University of Texas at Austin. Her research group at UT Austin uses serial section electron microscopy to study synapses. She is also a member of the Institute for Neuroscience and the Center for Theoretical and Computational Learning.

Background 
Harris was born in North Dakota. In 1976, she earned a bachelors degree at Minnesota State University Moorhead, majoring in biology and minoring in both chemistry and mathematics. Three years later, she earned her masters degree from the University of Illinois and went on to do graduate work at Northeastern Ohio Universities College of Medicine. She obtained a PhD in neurobiology in 1982, after which she held a two-year postdoctoral position at Massachusetts General Hospital. She was a member of the faculty in Neurology at the Harvard Medical School and Children's Hospital, Boston until 1999. Then she moved to Boston University where she helped to establish an inter-departmental Program in Neuroscience. In 2002, she established the Synapses and Cognitive Neuroscience Center at Medical College of Georgia. Harris was recruited to the University of Texas at Austin.

Research 
Harris's research focus is to elucidate structural components involved in the cell biology of learning and memory. She focuses on seven main areas of research, which include
 Behavior
 Cell Biology of neurons, muscle & glia
 Developmental Biology
 Ion Channels, Neurotransmitter Receptors & Molecular Signaling
 Learning & Memory
 Neural Development & Plasticity
 Synaptic Biology & Small Circuits

Awards 
 1999–2004 Packard Foundation Grant
 2002–04 Councilor, Society for Neuroscience
 2002–06 Georgia Research Alliance Eminent Scholar
 2003 Wiersma Visiting Professor, Caltech
 2003 Distinguished Alumna Award, Minnesota State University Moorhead
 2012–present Scientific Advisory Board, Max Planck Institute for Brain Research, Frankfurt, Germany
 2014–present Scientific Advisory Board, HHMI – Janelia Research Campus, Virginia
 2014 Outstanding Speaker Award, American Association for Clinical Chemistry
 2015–present Scientific Advisory Board, Allen Institute for Brain Research, Seattle, WA
 2016 Elected Fellow, AAAS

References

External links
 

American women neuroscientists
American neuroscientists
University of Texas at Austin faculty
Scientists from North Dakota
University of Illinois alumni
Date of birth missing (living people)
Living people
Year of birth missing (living people)
American women academics
21st-century American women